US Robert is a football club of Martinique, based in the town Le Robert.

Founded in 1903, they are the oldest club in Martinique. They play in the Martinique's first division, the Martinique Championnat National.

Achievements
Martinique Championnat National: 1
1993

Coupe de la Martinique: 2
1960, 1961

The club in the French football structure
French Cup: 1 appearance
1995/96

Performance in CONCACAF competitions
CFU Club Championship: 1 appearance
2002 – Final Round – Group B – 3rd place – 0 pts (stage 2 of 2)

CONCACAF Champions' Cup: 2 appearances
1994 – Third place match – Lost against  Alianza F.C. 4–2 on penalty kicks after 0 – 0
1992 – Second Round – Lost against  L'Etoile de Morne-à-l'Eau 2–1 on aggregate (stage 3 of 6)

CONCACAF Cup Winners Cup: 1 appearance
1993 – North/Caribbean Play-off

External links
 2007/2008 Club info at Antilles-Foot
 Club info – French Football Federation

References

Robert
Robert
1903 establishments in Martinique